Elżbieta Renata Jakubiak (born 17 March 1966) is a Polish politician, sports and tourism minister in the government of Jaroslaw Kaczynski, was head of the Polish President's Cabinet with the rank of secretary of state, and deputy to the Sejm sixth term of office.

Biography
Jakubiak was born in 1966 in Zatory, Poland, the daughter of Bronislaw Dabrowski and Krystyna. She graduated from the School of Special Education in Warsaw in 1991.

In 1990-1992, she worked in educational and Social Society in Warsaw, then to 1998 in the Chancellery of the Sejm, where she was the Vice-Marshals secretary Jack Kurczewski, Olga Krzyżanowska and John King. In 1998-2002 she served as Director of the Office of the Director-General of the Office for War Veterans and Repressed Persons. Since 2002, she has worked as director of the Office of the President of Warsaw.

Between 23 December 2005 to 23 July 2007 she occupied the position of secretary of state and head of the Polish President's Cabinet. In the period from 23 July 2007 to 16 November 2007 she was the minister of sport and tourism in the government of Jaroslaw Kaczynski.

In the parliamentary elections in 2007, Jakubiak was elected to the Sejm VI mandate from the list of Law and Justice in Siedlce district. She received 33,509 votes, which was the best individual result in this constituency. Later, she unsuccessfully stood for the PiS and the European Parliament elections in 2009 in Warsaw.

She was suspended in the rights of a member by the President of the Law and Justice party Jaroslaw Kaczynski on 8 September 2010. The decision of the Political Law and Justice party has been to exclude her from the party along with Joanna Kluzik-Rostkowska as "a detriment to the party". On 16 November 2010, MPs Joanna Kluzik-Rostkowska, Jakubiak and Pawel Poncyljusz, and MEPs Adam Bielan and Michał Kamiński formed a new political group, Poland Comes First (Polska jest Najważniejsza).

Personal life 
Jakubiak is married and has three children: twins, Joan and Thomas and daughter, Susanna.

Honours 
Portuguese Grand Cross of the Order of Merit: 2008

References 

1966 births
Living people
Poland Comes First politicians
Law and Justice politicians
Government ministers of Poland
Women government ministers of Poland
Recipients of the Silver Medal for Merit to Culture – Gloria Artis
Members of the Polish Sejm 2007–2011
21st-century Polish women politicians
People from Pułtusk County